Francisco Sebastián Nadal Martorell (born 27 June 1986), commonly known as Xisco Nadal, is a Spanish former professional footballer who played mainly as a forward.

Club career
Born in Palma de Mallorca, Balearic Islands, Nadal moved to Villarreal as a baby when his father Sebastián, also a footballer, joined Villarreal CF. He himself made his official debut for the same club against CA Osasuna on 2 February 2003. On 15 June, in the last minute of a 2–2 away draw with RCD Espanyol, he became the youngest player ever to score in a La Liga match, aged 16 years, 11 months and 18 days; he also appeared in four UEFA Cup and one Champions League games for the side.

However, Nadal was not used very often at Villarreal, and served Segunda División loans at CD Numancia and Real Murcia in the second halves of 2003–04 and 2004–05, respectively. He spent the entire 2006–07 season at Hércules CF of the same league, and only made a total of 31 league appearances between the three teams.

Nadal lost all ties to Villarreal in January 2008, and signed with newly-created side Granada 74 CF in the second tier. Upon their relegation he moved again, joining Levante UD on a two-year contract.

Although rarely a starter in 2009–10, Nadal contributed three goals in 32 matches as the Valencians returned to the top flight after a two-year absence. In the following campaign, in which he was used almost exclusively as a winger, he went scoreless in 25 games in an eventual escape from relegation; on 15 May 2011, he was sent off for a late challenge on Roberto Soldado in a 0–0 away draw against Valencia CF which certified the team's permanence.

On 11 September 2011, the 25-year-old Nadal agreed to a short-term deal with Alqueries CF in the Valencian regional divisions. After retiring in 2018 at the age of 32, he returned to the Estadio de la Cerámica as match delegate following an invitation from his former teammate Javier Calleja who acted as the club's manager.

International career
Nadal was part of Spain's under-17 squad that finished runners-up at the 2003 UEFA European Championship. In the same year he also played in the category's FIFA World Cup, with the nation losing in the final to Brazil.

References

External links

1986 births
Living people
Spanish footballers
Footballers from Palma de Mallorca
Association football wingers
Association football forwards
La Liga players
Segunda División players
Segunda División B players
Tercera División players
Divisiones Regionales de Fútbol players
Villarreal CF B players
Villarreal CF players
CD Numancia players
Real Murcia players
Hércules CF players
Granada 74 CF footballers
Levante UD footballers
Spain youth international footballers